Manuel "Cowboy" Donley (July 26, 1927 – June 28, 2020) was a Mexican-born pioneer of Tejano music.

In the 1940s, Donley, who had dropped out of school in the 7th grade, took a pioneering role in the orquesta sound, combining Mexican and American popular music elements and inspired by big band. He toured the Midwest and Texas for decades. In 1955, he began playing with his band Las Estrellas. During his career, he recorded over 150 singles.

Personal life
Manuel Donley Quiñones was born in Durango, Mexico to Ramón Donley and Dolores Quiñones. He had eight siblings.

Awards
He was a recipient of a 2014 National Heritage Fellowship awarded by the National Endowment for the Arts, which is the United States government's highest honor in the folk and traditional arts. He was inducted into the Tejano Music Hall of Fame in 1986.

References

Further reading
 Música Tejana and the Transition from Traditional to Modern: Manuel “Cowboy” Donley and the Austin Music Scene, Fuentes, Evangelina Liza. Texas State University M.A.

External links
 Records of Manuel "Cowboy" Donley from the Strachwitz Frontera Collection of Mexican and Mexican American recordings at UCLA
 Documentary about Donley from the UT Austin College of Communication
 

1927 births
2020 deaths
Place of death missing
Mexican expatriates in the United States
Mexican musicians
Mexican people of Irish descent
National Heritage Fellowship winners
Musicians from Durango